Silvaspinosus is a genus of braconid wasps in the family Braconidae. There is at least one described species in Silvaspinosus, S. vespa, found in Madagascar.

References

Microgastrinae